Leslie Groves (9 June 1911 – 4 September 1990) was a New Zealand sportsman. He played 16 first-class matches for Otago between 1929 and 1950.

Groves was born at Dunedin in 1911 and educated at Otago Boys' High School in the city. He worked as a manager. As well as cricket, Groves played association football for Otago and represented the New Zealand national football team. Following his death in 1990 obituaries were published in the 1991 New Zealand Cricket Annual and in Wisden.

References

External links
 

1911 births
1990 deaths
New Zealand cricketers
Otago cricketers
Cricketers from Dunedin